Justin David "J.D." Forrest (born April 15, 1981) is an American former professional ice hockey defenseman and current head coach of the Wilkes-Barre/Scranton Penguins in the American Hockey League.

Playing career

Forrest played four years with Boston College winning the NCAA Championship in 2001 whilst earning Hockey East All-Rookie honors. He was an ACHA Second-Team All-American in 2003 before graduating in 2004, serving as an alternate captain in both years. He then embarked on a lengthy professional career in Europe and North America with stints in Finland's Liiga, Switzerland's National League A as well as the American Hockey League. He retired in 2014 following two seasons with the Augsburger Panther of the Deutsche Eishockey Liga in Germany.

Coaching career

Following his retirement, Forrest was an assistant coach with the USA Hockey National Team Development Program winning Gold at the Under-18 IIHF World Championships in 2015. He then coached the farm club of EC Red Bull Salzburg in Austria for one season, before he was named by the Pittsburgh Penguins on August 2, 2016 as an assistant coach for their affiliate, the Wilkes-Barre/Scranton Penguins of the American Hockey League.

He earned a promotion to head coach on September 11, 2020.

Awards and honors

Career statistics

Regular season and playoffs

International

References

External links

Living people
Jokerit players
Ässät players
Augsburger Panther players
SaiPa players
Albany River Rats players
Worcester Sharks players
EHC Kloten players
American men's ice hockey defensemen
Boston College Eagles men's ice hockey players
Ice hockey players from New York (state)
1981 births
Carolina Hurricanes draft picks
Florida Everblades players
Elmira Jackals (ECHL) players
Oulun Kärpät players
Malmö Redhawks players
USA Hockey National Team Development Program players
Ice hockey coaches from New York (state)
AHCA Division I men's ice hockey All-Americans
NCAA men's ice hockey national champions